The 2012 Chesapeake Bayhawks season is the 12th season for the Chesapeake Bayhawks of Major League Lacrosse. The Bayhawks were looking to rebound after a semifinal loss in the 2011 MLL playoffs to Boston.

Off-season

Draft
The first Chesapeake Bayhawk to be drafted in 2012 was long-stick midfielder C.J. Costabile. He was the 5th overall pick, and netted 15 goals and 16 assists for 31 points in 3 years at Duke. The Bayhawks drafted 9 total men from the draft.

Regular season

Schedule

References

External links

Chesapeake Bayhawks seasons
Chesapeake Bayhawks